This is a list of Chinese national-type primary schools (SJK(C)) in Selangor, Malaysia. As of June 2022, there are 115 Chinese primary schools with a total of 107,444 students.

List of Chinese national-type primary schools in Selangor

Klang District

Kuala Langat District

Kuala Selangor District

Hulu Langat District

Hulu Selangor District

Sabak Bernam District

Gombak District

Petaling District

Sepang District

See also 

 Lists of Chinese national-type primary schools in Malaysia

References

 
Schools in Selangor
Selangor
Chinese-language schools in Malaysia